Walnut Township is a township in Brown County, Kansas, USA.  As of the 2000 census, its population was 665.

Walnut Township was formed in 1872.

Geography
According to the USGS, it contains six cemeteries: Congregational, Fairview, Isley, Lambertson, Saint Paul and Shelton.

The streams of Mulberry Creek, Noharts Creek and Spring Creek run through this township.

References

 USGS Geographic Names Information System (GNIS)

External links
 US-Counties.com
 City-Data.com

Townships in Brown County, Kansas
Townships in Kansas